The 1949–50 Panhellenic Championship was not held, due to increased obligations of the Greece national football team to qualify and participate in the Mediterranean Cup. Only the Athenian, Piraeus' and Macedonian championships were held, in which AEK Athens, Olympiacos and PAOK, respectively finished first. The point system was: Win: 3 points - Draw: 2 points - Loss: 1 point.

Qualification round

Athens Football Clubs Association

Piraeus Football Clubs Association

Macedonia Football Clubs Association

Final round

Not played.

See also
Mediterranean Cup (men's football)

References

External links
Rsssf, 1949–50 championship

Panhellenic Championship seasons
1949–50 in Greek football
Greek